is a Japanese form of energy healing, a type of alternative medicine. Reiki practitioners use a technique called palm healing or hands-on healing through which a "universal energy" is said to be transferred through the palms of the practitioner to the patient in order to encourage emotional or physical healing.

Reiki is a pseudoscience, and is used as an illustrative example of pseudoscience in scholarly texts and academic journal articles. It is based on qi ("chi"), which practitioners say is a universal life force, although there is no empirical evidence that such a life force exists.

Clinical research does not show reiki to be effective as a treatment for any medical condition, including cancer, diabetic neuropathy, anxiety or depression; therefore it should not replace conventional medical treatment.  There is no proof of the effectiveness of reiki therapy compared to placebo. Studies reporting positive effects have had methodological flaws.

Etymology

According to the Oxford English Dictionary, the English alternative medicine word reiki comes from Japanese  (霊気) "mysterious atmosphere, miraculous sign", combining  "soul, spirit" and  "vital energy"—the Sino-Japanese reading of Chinese  (靈氣) "numinous atmosphere".

Origins

According to the inscription on his memorial stone, Mikao Usui taught his system of reiki to more than 2,000 people during his lifetime. While teaching reiki in Fukuyama, Usui suffered a stroke and died on 9 March 1926. The first reiki clinic in the United States was started by Chujiro Hayashi's student Hawayo Takata in 1970.

Research and critical evaluation

Basis

Reiki's teachings and adherents claim that qi is physiological and can be manipulated to treat a disease or condition.  The existence of qi has not been established by medical research. Therefore, reiki is a pseudoscientific theory based on metaphysical concepts.

The existence of the proposed mechanism for reiki—qi or "life force" energy—has not been scientifically established. Most research on reiki is poorly designed and prone to bias. There is no reliable empirical evidence that reiki is helpful for treating any medical condition, although some physicians have said it might help promote general well-being. In 2011, William T. Jarvis of The National Council Against Health Fraud stated that there "is no evidence that clinical reiki's effects are due to anything other than suggestion" or the placebo effect.

The April 22, 2014, Skeptoid podcast episode titled "Your Body's Alleged Energy Fields" relates a reiki practitioner's report of what was happening as she passed her hands over a subject's body:

Evaluating these claims scientific skeptic author Brian Dunning reported:

Scholarly evaluation
Reiki is used as an illustrative example of pseudoscience in scholarly texts and academic journal articles.

In criticizing the State University of New York for offering a continuing education course on reiki, one source stated, "reiki postulates the existence of a universal energy unknown to science and thus far undetectable surrounding the human body, which practitioners can learn to manipulate using their hands," and others said, "In spite of its [reiki] diffusion, the baseline mechanism of action has not been demonstrated ..." and, "Neither the forces involved nor the alleged therapeutic benefits have been demonstrated by scientific testing."

Several authors have pointed to the vitalistic energy which reiki is claimed to treat, with one saying, "Ironically, the only thing that distinguishes reiki from therapeutic touch is that it [reiki] involves actual touch," and others stating that the International Center for Reiki Training "mimic[s] the institutional aspects of science" seeking legitimacy but holds no more promise than an alchemy society.

A guideline published by the American Academy of Neurology, the American Association of Neuromuscular & Electrodiagnostic Medicine, and the American Academy of Physical Medicine and Rehabilitation states, "Reiki therapy should probably not be considered for the treatment of PDN [painful diabetic neuropathy]." Canadian sociologist Susan J. Palmer has listed reiki as among the pseudoscientific healing methods used by cults in France to attract members.

Evidence quality 
A 2008 systematic review of nine randomized clinical trials found several shortcomings in the literature on reiki. Depending on the tools used to measure depression and anxiety, the results varied and were not reliable or valid. Furthermore, the scientific community has been unable to replicate the findings of studies that support reiki. The review also found issues in reporting methodology in some of the literature, in that often there were parts omitted completely or not clearly described. Frequently in these studies, sample sizes were not calculated and adequate allocation and double-blind procedures were not followed. The review also reported that such studies exaggerated the effectiveness of treatment and there was no control for differences in experience of reiki practitioners or even the same practitioner at times produced different outcomes. None of the studies in the review provided a rationale for the treatment duration and no study reported adverse effects.

Safety

Safety concerns for reiki sessions are very low and are akin to those of many complementary and alternative medicine practices.  Some physicians and  health care providers, however, believe that patients may unadvisedly substitute proven treatments for life-threatening conditions with unproven alternative modalities including reiki, thus endangering their health.

Catholic Church concerns
In March 2009, the Committee on Doctrine of the United States Conference of Catholic Bishops issued the document Guidelines for Evaluating Reiki as an Alternative Therapy, in which they declared that the practice of reiki was based on superstition, being neither truly faith healing nor science-based medicine. They stated that reiki was incompatible with Christian spirituality since it involved belief in a human power over healing rather than prayer to God, and that, viewed as a natural means of healing, it lacked scientific credibility. The 2009 guideline concluded that "since reiki therapy is not compatible with either Christian teaching or scientific evidence, it would be inappropriate for Catholic institutions, such as Catholic health care facilities and retreat centers, or persons representing the Church, such as Catholic chaplains, to promote or to provide support for reiki therapy." Since this announcement, some Catholic lay people have continued to practice reiki, but it has been removed from many Catholic hospitals and other institutions.

In a December 2014 article from the USCCB's Committee on Divine Worship on exorcism and its use in the Church, reiki is listed as a practice "that may have [negatively] impacted the current state of the afflicted person".

Training, certification and adoption
There is no central authority controlling use of the words reiki or reiki master. Certificates can be purchased online for under $100. It is "not uncommon" for a course to offer attainment of reiki master in two weekends. There is no regulation of practitioners or reiki master in the United States.

The Washington Post reported in 2014 that in response to customer demand at least 60 hospitals in the United States offered reiki, at a cost of between $40 and $300 per session.  Cancer Research UK reported in 2019 that some cancer centers and hospices in the UK offer free or low-cost reiki for people with cancer. The cost per session for treatment vary widely, but a CNBC report found a practitioner charging $229 per session of 60–90 minutes.

See also
 Glossary of alternative medicine
 Laying on of hands
 List of ineffective cancer treatments
 Scientific skepticism
 Quackery

References

Bibliography

External links

 
 

 
Energy (esotericism)
Energy therapies
1922 introductions
Biofield therapies
Japanese religious terminology
New Age practices
Pseudoscience